Darreh Sefid may refer to:
 Darreh Sefid, Mamasani, Fars Province
 Darreh Sefid, Sepidan, Fars Province
 Darreh Sefid, South Khorasan

See also
 Sefid Darreh